Janissaire was one of four s built for the French Navy in the first decade of the 20th century.

Design and description
The Chasseur class was based on the preceding , albeit oil-fired boilers rather than the coal-fired ones of the earlier ships. Designed to displaced , the ships displaced  at deep load. Their crew numbered 77–79 men.

Janissaire was powered by three Parsons direct-drive steam turbines, each driving one propeller shaft, using steam provided by three Foster-Wheeler boilers. Janissaire exceeded that speed during her sea trials, reaching .

The primary armament of the Chasseur-class ships consisted of six  Modèle 1902 guns in single mounts, one each fore and aft of the superstructure and the others were distributed amidships. They were also fitted with three  torpedo tubes. One of these was in a fixed mount in the bow and the other two were on single rotating mounts amidships.

Construction and career
Janissaire was ordered from Ateliers et Chantiers de Penhoët and was launched from its Saint-Nazaire shipyard on 12 April 1910. The ship was completed in June 1911. She survived the First World War to be condemned in October 1920.

References

Bibliography

Chasseur-class destroyers
Ships built in France
1910 ships